Judith Margaret Small  is a retired judge of the Federal Circuit Court of Australia and former folk singer.
 
Small was known for her feminist, often patriotic, and political songs, usually following a traditional theme. She produced twelve albums, hundreds of songs and has been described as being among the most popular political singers in Australia, with many such songs based on topical factual events like the Montreal Massacre. She enjoys singing about real people and issues, stating "If an audience comes away thinking about issues it is a worthwhile performance". She toured the country and internationally, playing primarily in clubs and pubs, and at various conventions.

Biography
 
Judy Small, now based in Melbourne was born in Coffs Harbour, New South Wales. She moved to Sydney in 1972, studying psychology and began her career as a singer and songwriter in the late 1970s, inspired by the folk boom of the 1960s and describing her influences as such folk singers as Joan Baez, Peter, Paul and Mary and The Seekers.       

One of her successful ballads is "The White Bay Paper Seller", based on newspaper seller and Sydney icon Beatrice Bush. Apart from her own repertoire she is a renowned interpreter of song both traditional and contemporary.

After a successful performance at the Vancouver Folk Music Festival in 1982 she became a full-time singer-songwriter. Over the next the 16 years, she regularly toured throughout the United States, Canada, the United Kingdom, Denmark, Australia and New Zealand.  
 
In 1990, she received the "Mo" Award - Mo Awards for Australian Folk Performer of the Year and in 1997 was the Port Fairy Folk Festival Artist of the Year. She was also invited to Beijing for the United Nations Women's Conference NGO Forum - UN in 1995, where she sang to thousands of women from all over the world.  
 
People had been asking for some years for Judy Small to release an album recorded live, so they can hear her introductions and stories of her songs, which have become much a part of the show, as her actual concert performance, so a concert was recorded called "Live at the Artery" in her home town of Melbourne and subsequently was released as a double CD Collection set, spanning her 35-plus years of music.

Judy Small retired from full-time performance in 1998. She became a family lawyer in Melbourne working for Victoria Legal Aid, but continued to write new songs and to perform regularly. In March 2013, she was appointed as a Judge with the Federal Circuit Court of Australia, and retired fully from performing. Judy retired from the Bench in April 2020.

She married Charlotte Stockwell in Wanaka, New Zealand on 10 May 2014.

Judy was appointed Co-Chair of Midsumma Festival in September 2019.

Music

Judy Small's songs cover a wide range of topics and styles, especially social justice, equity and harmony with a particular emphasis on feminism and peace. Among the most popular are "Mothers, Daughters, Wives", "Women of Our Time", "One Voice in the Crowd" and "Global Village".

Her songs have been recorded by numerous artists including Ronnie Gilbert, Eric Bogle, Charlie King and Priscilla Herdman and groups such as The McCalmans and The Corries. Several of her recordings have been translated to a number of languages.

Discography
 A Natural Selection (1982) 
 Mothers, Daughters, Wives (1984)
 Ladies and Gems (1984)
 One Voice in the Crowd (1985)
 The Anzacs (with Ted Egan, Eric Bogle, Nerys Evans and the Anzac Band & Singers) (1985)
 Home Front (1988)
 Snapshot (1990)
 Best of Judy Small (1992)
 Second Wind (1993)
 Global Village (1995)
 Three Sheilas (1997)
 Let the Rainbow Shine (1999)
 Never Turning Back (2001)
 Mosaic (2003)
 Judy Small: Live at The Artery (2006) (double 2 CD disc, recorded live in Melbourne)

Awards and recognition

Mo Awards
The Australian Entertainment Mo Awards (commonly known informally as the Mo Awards), were annual Australian entertainment industry awards. They recognise achievements in live entertainment in Australia from 1975 to 2016.
 (wins only)
|-
| 1989
| Judy Small
| Folk Performer of the Year
| 
|-

In 1995, she was invited to Beijing for the United Nations Women's Conference NGO Forum. 
In 1997 she was the Port Fairy Folk Festival Artist of the Year. 
In 2006, Australian Rhymes Magazine named her club/pub entertainer/performer of the year. 
In June 2013 she was made a Member of the Order of Australia (AM) for her contribution to folk music.

References

External links
 Official website

Living people
Year of birth missing (living people)
Australian women singers
Australian folk singers
Political music artists
Judges of the Federal Circuit Court of Australia
21st-century Australian judges
Members of the Order of Australia
20th-century Australian women
21st-century Australian women